Bradhurst is a given and surname most prevalent in the United States. Notable people with the name include:
Bradhurst Schieffelin (1824–1909), druggist and activist
Maunsell Bradhurst Field (1822–1875), judge and lawyer
Samuel Bradhurst Schieffelin (1811–1900), businessman and author

References 

Given names
Surnames